The 1988–89 NBA season was the 76ers 40th season in the NBA and 26th season in Philadelphia. In the 1988 NBA draft, the 76ers selected power forward Charles D. Smith from the University of Pittsburgh with the third overall pick, but then traded him to the Los Angeles Clippers in exchange for shooting guard Hersey Hawkins from Bradley University, as the team needed more backcourt scoring to complement the inside play of Charles Barkley. The team also acquired Ron Anderson from the Indiana Pacers during the off-season. The Sixers would return to the NBA Playoffs after failing to qualify in 1988, holding a 26–20 record at the All-Star break, and finishing second in the Atlantic Division with a 46–36 record. 

Barkley averaged 25.8 points, 12.5 rebounds and 1.6 steals per game, and was named to the All-NBA First Team, and selected for the 1989 NBA All-Star Game, while Mike Gminski averaged 17.2 points, 9.4 rebounds and 1 3 blocks per game, and Hawkins provided the team with 15.1 points and 1.5 steals per game, and was selected to the NBA All-Rookie First Team. In addition, Anderson played a sixth man role, averaging 16.2 points per game off the bench, while Cliff Robinson provided with 15.1 points and 5.4 rebounds per game, but only played just 14 games due to a knee injury, and Maurice Cheeks contributed 11.6 points, 7.8 assists and 1.5 steals per game. Barkley also finished in sixth place in Most Valuable Player voting, and Anderson finished tied in fourth place in Most Improved Player voting.

In the postseason, the Sixers lost an Eastern Conference First Round series to the New York Knicks in a 3–0 sweep. The second game was noteable, because the team blew a 10-point lead with approximately 2 minutes left in the game, as Knicks guard Trent Tucker's three-point shot with less than 10 seconds left gave New York the win at home, 107–106. 

Following the season, Cheeks and David Wingate were both traded to the San Antonio Spurs, and Robinson was released to free agency.

Draft picks

Roster

Regular season

Season standings

z - clinched division title
y - clinched division title
x - clinched playoff spot

Record vs. opponents

Game log

Regular season

|- align="center" bgcolor="#ccffcc"
| 1
| November 4
| L.A. Clippers
|- align="center" bgcolor="#ccffcc"
| 2
| November 5
| Boston
|- align="center" bgcolor="#ffcccc"
| 3
| November 8
| Detroit
|- align="center" bgcolor="#ffcccc"
| 4
| November 9
| @ Milwaukee
|- align="center" bgcolor="#ccffcc"
| 5
| November 11
| Atlanta
|- align="center" bgcolor="#ffcccc"
| 6
| November 15
| @ Chicago
|- align="center" bgcolor="#ccffcc"
| 7
| November 16
| Chicago
|- align="center" bgcolor="#ccffcc"
| 8
| November 18
| New York
|- align="center" bgcolor="#ffcccc"
| 9
| November 19
| @ New York
|- align="center" bgcolor="#ccffcc"
| 10
| November 22
| @ Washington
|- align="center" bgcolor="#ccffcc"
| 11
| November 23
| Cleveland
|- align="center" bgcolor="#ccffcc"
| 12
| November 25
| Charlotte
|- align="center" bgcolor="#ccffcc"
| 13
| November 26
| Indiana
|- align="center" bgcolor="#ffcccc"
| 14
| November 28
| L.A. Lakers
|- align="center" bgcolor="#ccffcc"
| 15
| November 30
| Portland

|- align="center" bgcolor="#ffcccc"
| 16
| December 1
| @ Charlotte
|- align="center" bgcolor="#ccffcc"
| 17
| December 3
| @ Indiana
|- align="center" bgcolor="#ccffcc"
| 18
| December 7
| Denver
|- align="center" bgcolor="#ffcccc"
| 19
| December 9
| @ Boston
|- align="center" bgcolor="#ffcccc"
| 20
| December 10
| @ Detroit
|- align="center" bgcolor="#ffcccc"
| 21
| December 13
| Milwaukee
|- align="center" bgcolor="#ffcccc"
| 22
| December 14
| @ Atlanta
|- align="center" bgcolor="#ccffcc"
| 23
| December 16
| @ New Jersey
|- align="center" bgcolor="#ccffcc"
| 24
| December 17
| Utah
|- align="center" bgcolor="#ffcccc"
| 25
| December 20
| Dallas
|- align="center" bgcolor="#ccffcc"
| 26
| December 25
| Washington
|- align="center" bgcolor="#ffcccc"
| 27
| December 27
| @ Golden State
|- align="center" bgcolor="#ffcccc"
| 28
| December 28
| @ L.A. Lakers
|- align="center" bgcolor="#ffcccc"
| 29
| December 30
| @ Utah

|- align="center" bgcolor="#ffcccc"
| 30
| January 5
| @ San Antonio
|- align="center" bgcolor="#ccffcc"
| 31
| January 7
| @ Houston
|- align="center" bgcolor="#ccffcc"
| 32
| January 9
| @ Dallas
|- align="center" bgcolor="#ccffcc"
| 33
| January 11
| New Jersey
|- align="center" bgcolor="#ccffcc"
| 34
| January 13
| Atlanta
|- align="center" bgcolor="#ccffcc"
| 35
| January 15
| @ Charlotte
|- align="center" bgcolor="#ffcccc"
| 36
| January 16
| Charlotte
|- align="center" bgcolor="#ccffcc"
| 37
| January 18
| Boston
|- align="center" bgcolor="#ffcccc"
| 38
| January 20
| @ Boston
|- align="center" bgcolor="#ffcccc"
| 39
| January 21
| @ Washington
|- align="center" bgcolor="#ccffcc"
| 40
| January 25
| Chicago
|- align="center" bgcolor="#ccffcc"
| 41
| January 27
| Golden State
|- align="center" bgcolor="#ccffcc"
| 42
| January 28
| @ New Jersey
|- align="center" bgcolor="#ffcccc"
| 43
| January 31
| @ Cleveland

|- align="center" bgcolor="#ccffcc"
| 44
| February 1
| Washington
|- align="center" bgcolor="#ffcccc"
| 45
| February 3
| Detroit
|- align="center" bgcolor="#ccffcc"
| 46
| February 8
| Seattle
|- align="center" bgcolor="#ccffcc"
| 47
| February 14
| @ Indiana
|- align="center" bgcolor="#ccffcc"
| 48
| February 15
| Indiana
|- align="center" bgcolor="#ffcccc"
| 49
| February 17
| New Jersey
|- align="center" bgcolor="#ffcccc"
| 50
| February 18
| @ Cleveland
|- align="center" bgcolor="#ccffcc"
| 51
| February 22
| @ Miami
|- align="center" bgcolor="#ffcccc"
| 52
| February 24
| @ Phoenix
|- align="center" bgcolor="#ffcccc"
| 53
| February 26
| @ Denver
|- align="center" bgcolor="#ccffcc"
| 54
| February 28
| @ L.A. Clippers

|- align="center" bgcolor="#ccffcc"
| 55
| March 1
| @ Sacramento
|- align="center" bgcolor="#ffcccc"
| 56
| March 3
| @ Portland
|- align="center" bgcolor="#ffcccc"
| 57
| March 4
| @ Seattle
|- align="center" bgcolor="#ffcccc"
| 58
| March 6
| Phoenix
|- align="center" bgcolor="#ccffcc"
| 59
| March 7
| @ Chicago
|- align="center" bgcolor="#ccffcc"
| 60
| March 9
| Sacramento
|- align="center" bgcolor="#ffcccc"
| 61
| March 11
| Detroit
|- align="center" bgcolor="#ccffcc"
| 62
| March 15
| New Jersey
|- align="center" bgcolor="#ccffcc"
| 63
| March 16
| @ New York
|- align="center" bgcolor="#ffcccc"
| 64
| March 18
| @ Washington
|- align="center" bgcolor="#ffcccc"
| 65
| March 20
| New York
|- align="center" bgcolor="#ccffcc"
| 66
| March 22
| Cleveland
|- align="center" bgcolor="#ccffcc"
| 67
| March 24
| San Antonio
|- align="center" bgcolor="#ffcccc"
| 68
| March 26
| @ Boston
|- align="center" bgcolor="#ccffcc"
| 69
| March 28
| Boston
|- align="center" bgcolor="#ccffcc"
| 70
| March 31
| Miami

|- align="center" bgcolor="#ccffcc"
| 71
| April 2
| Houston
|- align="center" bgcolor="#ccffcc"
| 72
| April 4
| @ New York
|- align="center" bgcolor="#ffcccc"
| 73
| April 5
| @ Atlanta
|- align="center" bgcolor="#ccffcc"
| 74
| April 7
| @ Charlotte
|- align="center" bgcolor="#ffcccc"
| 75
| April 8
| @ Milwaukee
|- align="center" bgcolor="#ffcccc"
| 76
| April 11
| @ Cleveland
|- align="center" bgcolor="#ffcccc"
| 77
| April 14
| Charlotte
|- align="center" bgcolor="#ccffcc"
| 78
| April 16
| New York
|- align="center" bgcolor="#ccffcc"
| 79
| April 18
| Milwaukee
|- align="center" bgcolor="#ccffcc"
| 80
| April 20
| @ New Jersey
|- align="center" bgcolor="#ffcccc"
| 81
| April 21
| @ Detroit
|- align="center" bgcolor="#ccffcc"
| 82
| April 23
| Washington

Playoffs

|- align="center" bgcolor="#ffcccc"
| 1
| April 27
| @ New York
| L 96–102
| Ron Anderson (26)
| Charles Barkley (12)
| Maurice Cheeks (16)
| Madison Square Garden19,591
| 0–1
|- align="center" bgcolor="#ffcccc"
| 2
| April 29
| @ New York
| L 106–107
| Charles Barkley (30)
| Charles Barkley (12)
| Maurice Cheeks (12)
| Madison Square Garden19,591
| 0–2
|- align="center" bgcolor="#ffcccc"
| 3
| May 2
| New York
| L 115–116 (OT)
| Charles Barkley (29)
| Charles Barkley (11)
| Maurice Cheeks (11)
| Spectrum16,236
| 0–3
|-

Player statistics

Playoffs

Awards and records
 Charles Barkley, All-NBA First Team
 Hersey Hawkins, NBA All-Rookie Team 1st Team

References

See also
 1988-89 NBA season

Philadelphia 76ers seasons
Philadelphia
Philadelphia
Philadelphia